Ethan Ischer (born 1 February 2007 in Bavois) is a Swiss racing driver. He is set to compete in 2023 Italian F4 Championship and 2023 ACCR Formula 4 Championship with Jenzer Motorsport.

Career

Lower formulae 
Ischer made his car racing debut in ADAC Formula 4 in 2022 with Jenzer Motorsport. He raced in one round and was not classified, because he competed as a guest. That year he also raced in Italian F4 Championship where he competed the whole season, but failed to score points. He also appeared in round 4 of F4 Spanish Championship with Saintéloc Racing but failed to score points again.

In 2023 he is racing in Formula Winter Series. Ischer is also due to compete in Italian F4 Championship and ACCR Formula 4 Championship again with Jenzer Motorsport.

Racing record

Career summary

† As Ischer was a guest driver, he was ineligible for championship points.

* Season still in progress.

Complete Formula Winter Series results 
(key) (Races in bold indicate pole position; races in italics indicate fastest lap)

References

External links 

 

Swiss racing drivers
2007 births
Living people
ADAC Formula 4 drivers
Italian F4 Championship drivers
Spanish F4 Championship drivers
Saintéloc Racing drivers
Jenzer Motorsport drivers